Theodosia Bartow Prevost (November 1746 – May 18, 1794), also known as Theodosia Bartow Burr, was an American Patriot.  Raised by a widowed mother, she married British Army officer Jacques Marcus Prevost at age 17. After the American Revolution began, her own Patriot leanings led her to offer the use of her house, the Hermitage, as a meeting- and resting-place for revolutionaries, including Alexander Hamilton, Marquis de Lafayette, and Aaron Burr; it was briefly used as the headquarters of George Washington, who counted her amongst his friends. Burr's visit to the Hermitage began a secret romance that, following the death of Prevost's first husband, led to marriage.

The couple moved to New York City due to Burr's legal practice, and she acted as a crucial ally and confidante as he began his political career. She was known for her wit, unusually deep education and intellectual acuity; her death in 1794 left Burr without "his best ally in the political wars to come".

Early life 

Theodosia was born in November 1746 to Ann Sands Stillwell and Theodosius Bartow, an attorney, in Shrewsbury Township, New Jersey. Her mother's family was noted for their beauty and had lived in America since 1638; her father's family had arrived in 1702 when John Bartow was sent to establish a Church of England ministry in Westchester County, New York. Theodosius died on October 5, 1746, several weeks before Theodosia was born. Five years later, Theodosia's mother married Philip de Visme, a captain in the British Army, with whom she had five more children.

De Visme provided for Theodosia's tutoring, ensuring that she received a "cosmopolitan education" and became fluent in French. She would later translate French political treatises to English, and exchanged informed political observations and arguments as equals with Burr in their correspondence.

At the age of seventeen, Theodosia married Jacques Marcus Prevost, a Swiss native and the brother of Augustine Prévost, who was serving as commander of the British Army forces in New Jersey. They married in Trinity Church in 1763. They had five children: Sally, Anna Louisa, Mary Louisa, Augustine, and John. When Prevost was dispatched to the West Indies in the early 1770s, Theodosia and the children remained in New Jersey.

Revolutionary War 
Despite her family's background (both her stepfather and husband were officers of the Royal American Regiment) Theodosia aligned herself with the Patriots, counting William Livingston and Robert Troup as friends and allies. During the Revolution Theodosia's home, the Hermitage – named after the cottage of Jean-Jacques Rousseau – became a gathering-place for American soldiers. When she heard that George Washington was in the area following the Battle of Monmouth she extended an invitation for him to stay there. He accepted this invitation in July 1778, and briefly utilized the Hermitage as his headquarters. The home and its culture were "decidedly French" due to Theodosia's background, and she was known for the intelligent conversation her French salons represented. Other visitors included generals Charles Lee and Jeremiah Wadsworth.

During the war, with her estate being owned by her husband, it was at various times under risk of confiscation as Loyalist property; her powerful friends, allies and patrons, including Livingston and William Paterson, ensured the case was halted.

Theodosia first met Aaron Burr in July 1778 when he accompanied George Washington to her home after the Battle of Monmouth. The two became friends and Burr began regularly visiting Theodosia's home in New Jersey. By November 1778 he was writing to his sister to speak of Theodosia's "honest and affectionate heart" and their regular conversations; his constant visits to the Hermitage provoked gossip, with Paterson baldly referring to Theodosia as "the object of [Burr's] Affections". The two fell in love, and by 1780 were openly lovers, despite a 10-year age gap. In December 1781, Theodosia discovered her husband had died of yellow fever.

Theodosia and Burr's writings to each other covered politics, philosophy and feminism, with the two discussing both Rousseau and British feminist Mary Wollstonecraft. They modelled their relationship on a "mature affection", rather than the standard practice of marriages and relationships being based on social standing and convenience rather than love; this appealed to Theodosia's sense of independence and intellectual freedom. After Burr became licensed as an attorney, Theodosia and he married on July 2, 1782 at the Hermitage, with Livingston personally issuing the license. Their first child, and the only one to survive to adulthood, was born on June 21, 1783, and also named Theodosia.

Later life and death 
The Burrs moved to New York City in 1783, moving to Broadway in 1790 as Aaron's legal career took off. This increase in work led to him travelling more, but their "intellectual partnership" did not suffer: the two wrote letters back and forth notable for their candor, with Theodosia constantly disagreeing with her husband's views, "never shy to point out his flaws", and Aaron treating her as he would any other intelligent person, sending her political books and newspapers on a regular basis that he thought she would enjoy. Theodosia's keen sense of observation and adeptness at "judging [Aaron's] peers on the national scene" made her a crucial ally in his political career, particularly after he joined the United States Senate in 1791.

Both Theodosia and Aaron had a "passionate commitment to education", and Theodosia educated her daughter as any wealthy male child would have been: she could read and write at three, studied Latin, Greek and French, and had read Decline and Fall of the Roman Empire by age 10. Aaron handled more and more of this as Theodosia's health began to deteriorate. Her illness was not a shock – she had been ill as long as they had known each other – but by 1792 she was in regular pain, with doctors' prescriptions doing little to help. Aaron offered to resign from the Senate to spend more time with her, but she refused to allow it. She died on May 28, 1794 at the age of 47. She was buried in the now defunct St. John's Burying Ground, which was associated with Trinity Church.  Aaron later wrote that she was "the best woman and finest lady" he had ever known.

References

Bibliography 
 
 
 

1746 births
1794 deaths
18th-century American women
American people of English descent
People from Monmouth County, New Jersey
Aaron Burr
Burr family
Women in the American Revolution